The  Portland Thunder season was the second season for the arena football franchise in the Arena Football League. The team was coached by Mike Hohensee and played their home games at the Moda Center. The Thunder finished third in the Pacific division and 5–13 for the second straight year, and were also one of two teams to go winless on the road. Despite not qualifying for the playoffs with their win–loss record, because the league elected to cease operations of the Las Vegas Outlaws, who had finished ahead of Portland for the final playoff berth in the National Conference, Portland was awarded a playoff berth in their place. They were defeated in the conference semifinals by the San Jose SaberCats, 55–28.

Standings

Schedule

Regular season
The 2015 regular season schedule was released on December 19, 2014.

Playoffs

Final roster

References

Portland Thunder
Portland Thunder seasons
Portland Thunder
2015 in sports in Oregon